Arhiljevica is the name of a lost medieval village and monastery (dedicated to the "Holy Mother of God") which existed during the Serbian Empire and its aftermath. It was in the possession of the Dejanović noble family. Based on Emperor Stefan Dušan's charter dating to 10 August 1354, Arhiljevica was situated where the granted villages of Podlešane, Izvor and Rućinci lay, on the slopes of Jezer (Kumanovska Crna Gora). The fact that Dejan built Arhiljevica rather than renovated it is evidence of his economic strength.

References

Sources

Former populated places in the Balkans
Lost cities and towns
Serbian Empire
Medieval Macedonia
14th-century Serbian Orthodox church buildings
Medieval Serbian Orthodox monasteries
Dejanović noble family